Welch Crag is a steep rugged peak, which is marked by secondary spires rising to  in the northeastern part of McSaveney Spur in the Willett Range of Victoria Land in Antarctica. It was named by the Advisory Committee on Antarctic Names in 2005 after Kathleen A. Welch, Department of Geology, University of Alabama; she has been a team member in the US Antarctic Program McMurdo Dry Valleys Long-Term Ecological Research for 23 field seasons  between 1994 and 2016.

References

Mountains of Victoria Land
Welch